Amba Matha also spelled as Amba Mutt is a village near Somalapura in the Sindhanur taluk of Raichur district in Karnataka state, India. Amba Matha is a holy place, Sri Amba Devi Temple is located in the village.

See also
Salagunda
Roudkunda
Maski
Sindhanur
Raichur

References

Villages in Raichur district
Hindu temples in Raichur district